"Not Quite Dead Enough" is a Nero Wolfe mystery novella by Rex Stout, first published in abridged form in the December 1942 issue of The American Magazine. It first appeared in book form as the first of two novellas in the short-story collection Not Quite Dead Enough, published by Farrar & Rinehart in 1944.

Plot summary

Archie has recently joined the Army and is now Major Goodwin. His high rank, as a rookie GI, reflects the fact that the Army recognizes and is making use of his civilian expertise by assigning him to domestic (counter) intelligence, specifically a unit based back in New York City, where Archie lived with his erstwhile boss Nero Wolfe before enlisting.

Since most of his civilian investigations had been done with Nero Wolfe, the Army also wishes to have Wolfe do intelligence investigations, but Wolfe thinks he didn't kill enough Germans in the previous war and so is more intent on joining the army as a soldier, not intelligence officer.

To this end, pleas from the Pentagon to this effect have been ignored, and indeed the whole household routine Wolfe is (in)famous for has already been abandoned during Archie's short absence in favor of strict adherence to wartime rations (inconsistent with gourmet dining) and losing weight, which Wolfe and Fritz Brenner (the live-in cook/chef) attempt by morning exercises on the west river banks, while letters not to mention mountains of other correspondence pile up in the previously tidy office/study in the brownstone. As ludicrous as the whole setup might seem, even Goodwin, when he arrives back in New York from Washington to discover it, is unable to budge Wolfe, at least at first.

Meanwhile, on the (scarce) flight back to New York from Washington, Archie has annoyed wealthy and beautiful Lily Rowan, whom he met earlier in Some Buried Caesar and with whom he has the beginnings of a romance, because he has no time for her, even though she has gone to great lengths to get the seat next to his. Lily, by way of counterattack as much as anything, asks him to look into a problem a girl-friend of hers is having. Archie, having assessed the grim situation at Wolfe's brownstone, seizes an opportunity to be doing something useful, even if he isn't directly carrying out his assignment from the Pentagon.

Archie (who tells this story as he does all Wolfe stories), likes Lily but wants to be in control, and in an impish assertion of independence he takes Lily's friend to the Flamingo nightclub as part of his "investigation", causing Lily to storm home in a mild fit of jealousy. But soon she asks Archie's help in a bigger problem: her friend is dead. After rushing to the scene, Archie decides to implicate himself in the crime and get his picture in the paper, reasoning that getting him out of jail is no more foolish a war effort for Wolfe than pathetic dockside exercises. In the end, Archie carries out his assignment from the Pentagon (despite having his picture in the paper as a murder suspect), Lily gets herself a boyfriend, and Wolfe solves the underlying crime, but not without teaching both Lily and Archie a thing or two about the consequences of mixing business with romance.

Publication history

"Not Quite Dead Enough"
1942, The American Magazine, December 1942, abridged

Not Quite Dead Enough
1944, New York: Farrar & Rinehart, September 7, 1944, hardcover
Contents include "Not Quite Dead Enough" and "Booby Trap"
In his limited-edition pamphlet, Collecting Mystery Fiction #9, Rex Stout's Nero Wolfe Part I, Otto Penzler describes the first edition of Not Quite Dead Enough: "Red cloth, front cover and spine printed with black; rear cover blank. Issued in a mainly black, red and blue pictorial dust wrapper. … The first edition has the publisher's monogram logo on the copyright page. the second printing, in the same year, is identical to the first except that the logo was dropped."
In April 2006, Firsts: The Book Collector's Magazine estimated that the first edition of Not Quite Dead Enough had a value of between $1,000 and $2,000.
1944, Toronto: Oxford University Press, 1944, hardcover
1944, New York: Detective Book Club #33, December 1944, hardcover
1944, New York: Detective Book Club, 1944, hardcover
1945, New York: Armed Services Edition #P-6, February 1945, paperback
1946, New York: Grosset & Dunlap, 1946, hardcover
New York: Lawrence E. Spivak, Jonathan Press #J27, not dated, paperback
1949, New York: Dell mapback #267, 1949, paperback
1963, New York: Pyramid (Green Door) #R-822, February 1963, paperback
1992, New York: Bantam Crimeline  October 1992, paperback, Rex Stout Library edition with introduction by John Lutz
1995, Burlington, Ontario: Durkin Hayes Publishing, DH Audio  July 1994, audio cassette (unabridged, read by Saul Rubinek)
2004, Auburn, California: The Audio Partners Publishing Corp., Mystery Masters  February 2004, audio CD (unabridged, read by Michael Prichard)
2010, New York: Bantam Crimeline  May 26, 2010, e-book

References

External links

Not Quite Dead Enough first edition dustjacket at the NYPL Digital Gallery

1942 short stories
Nero Wolfe short stories
Works originally published in The American Magazine